The East Junction Branch (formerly known as the Seekonk Branch Railroad and the India Point Branch) is a historic railroad line owned and operated by the Providence and Worcester Railroad in the U.S. state of Rhode Island and by the Massachusetts Bay Transportation Authority in Massachusetts. The line runs from the P&W's East Providence Branch in East Providence, Rhode Island, northeast to Amtrak's Shore Line (Northeast Corridor) at East Junction in Attleboro, Massachusetts, along a former New York, New Haven and Hartford Railroad line. In Massachusetts, CSX Transportation operates local freight service via trackage rights, which it also has on the Shore Line north towards Boston.  The Massachusetts Coastal Railroad and the MBTA commuter rail have operating rights in Massachusetts; however, neither have ever run trains on the branch.

The line was originally constructed as a part of the original Boston and Providence mainline in the 1830s, making it one of the earliest railroads in North America.  After the construction of the new Boston and Providence mainline (now known as the Northeast Corridor), the branch still served as an integral connection for trains traveling to Bristol, Pawtucket, Worcester, and Providence.  Services on the branch were cut back following the abandonment of the Providence, Warren and Bristol branch and the Crook Point Bascule Bridge in the 1970s. The line still sees moderate freight activity between East Providence and Attleboro.

History

The East Junction Branch is part of the original Boston and Providence Rail Road, opened in 1835. The original terminal of the B&P was India Point; at the time the early railroad was built in 1835 East Providence was still part of Seekonk, Massachusetts and for a time the east bank of the Seekonk River would be the terminal since Rhode Island's lawmakers initially had doubts about allowing the railroad to cross the river into Providence. However, by the time regular service began in July 1835, about a thousand feet of track had been built in Rhode Island to a steamboat dock at India Point.

The eastern bank of the Seekonk River opposite India Point was the junction of several railroads. It was the southern terminal of the Seekonk Branch Railroad, a short-lived Boston & Providence rival which owned a quarter mile spur between the B&P south to a privately owned dock. The Seekonk Branch Railroad failed to win a legal battle with the B&P due to Massachusetts State Legislature that allowed a railroad company to deny any traffic on private right-of-ways; the Seekonk Branch folded and sold its property to the B&P in 1839. 

The area of Seekonk that banked the Seekonk River was reincorporated as East Providence, Rhode Island as part of a boundary settlement between the two states in 1862; this would effectively split the line between the two states.

Expansion 
The line would officially become a branch in 1847 with the opening of the new B&P mainline from East Junction to Providence. After Union Station was opened in the center of Providence in 1848, it became the Boston & Providence's main terminal and the facilities along the harbor were used thereafter mainly for freight. The Providence, Warren & Bristol was built through East Providence in 1855 to reach India Point and Fox Point from the south; the PW&B would continue south towards Bristol and would also construct a branch to Fall River.

In 1874, the Providence & Worcester built the East Providence Branch which connected the P&W mainline and Wilkesbarre Pier (located at what is now Bold Point Park). An interlocking station at the connection between the East Junction Branch and the East Providence Branch was constructed north of Waterman Avenue in East Providence.

Operations under Old Colony and New Haven 

The B&P was leased by the Old Colony Railroad in 1888 and the line was labeled as the India Point Branch. The New York, New Haven and Hartford Railroad leased the Old Colony in 1893. 

The electrification of the Providence, Warren & Bristol in 1900 increased the feasibility of a mile-long tunnel under college hill to provide a way of getting trains from the east bay to Union Station in the center of Providence and an alternate route to Boston. The Crook Point Bascule Bridge along with the East Side Tunnel and a downtown viaduct were put into service on November 15, 1908.

Decline 
Although the line was well patronized and service was frequent for many years, growing automobile ownership doomed passenger services on the line.  In 1934 the Providence, Warren and Bristol dismantled electrification on their Providence-Bristol route before ceasing all passenger service on the line in 1938.  Passenger services on the East Junction Branch would persist during the 1950s and early 1960s; a station located at the Narragansett Park Horse Track attracted substantial ridership for the line during this time. 

In 1969 the New Haven was merged into Penn Central Transportation; soon thereafter, all passenger services between Union Station via the East Junction branch ceased. The MBTA acquired the piece in Massachusetts on January 27, 1973, despite it not seeing any passenger service. The newly independent Providence and Worcester Railroad assumed operations on the Rhode Island portion of the branch in 1976, while PC successor Conrail inherited freight rights on the Massachusetts portion.  

When Rhode Island ended passenger rail subsidies for MBTA services to Providence in 1981, a potential commuter rail extension of the Attleboro line to a new terminus near Newman Avenue in Seekonk via the East Junction Branch was briefly considered. Service subsidies to Rhode Island were restored in 1988 which negated the need for a Seekonk station; north Seekonk would instead be serviced by South Attleboro station which opened along the Northeast Corridor in 1990.  

The line from Wilkesbarre Pier to Bristol was officially abandoned in 1976 due to low freight demand. That same year, the Crook Point Bascule Bridge, East Side Tunnel, and India Point Bridge were also abandoned. The east side viaduct was demolished when the Northeast Corridor was re-routed to facilitate remodeling of the downtown area of Providence in the early 1980s; Providence Station would replace the old Union Station in 1986.

Current operations and route 

The branch breaks from the Northeast Corridor at East Junction in Attleborough; an MBTA yard is located at the junction. The branch travels southward through rural areas of Seekonk before entering Pawtucket where it crosses the Ten Mile River in Slater Park. The line continues into Rumford where it crosses the Boston and Providence Railroad Bridge; the branch then curves westward and connects to the East Providence Branch via a new track built by the P&W in 2006.  

Freight would continue to service a scrapyard at Wilkesbarre Pier until the early 2000s. CSX placed most of the Seekonk portion of the branch out of service in 2001 excluding the northernmost portion in Attleborough where an active customer remained; this 1.81 mile segment has remained in a state of neglect for over twenty years despite the line being considered active. In 2006, the final half of a mile in East Providence was abandoned by the P&W, with a new connection built to the East Providence Branch. P&W continued to serve only the Rhode Island portion of the East Junction Branch until 2007, when a metals customer north of Newman Avenue in Seekonk asked for renewed rail service. P&W returned the line to service into Seekonk for the new customer that year.

Former stations 
There are no physical remnants of any station sites on the East Junction Branch. Several stations were either relocated to the new B&P mainline, cut early on or consolidated due to the emergence of streetcars in Pawtucket and East Providence.

Gallery

See also 

 East Bay Bike Path
 Railroads in Rhode Island
 Boston and Providence Railroad

References

External links

CSX Transportation lines
MBTA Commuter Rail
Rail infrastructure in Rhode Island
Rail infrastructure in Massachusetts
Old Colony Railroad lines
Providence and Worcester Railroad